Dhat Teri Ki is a Bangladeshi romance comedy film directed by Shamim Ahamed Roni and produced by Abdul Aziz under the banner of Jaaz Multimedia. the film features Arifin Shuvoo, Nusrat Faria, Ziaul Roshan and Farin Khan in lead roles. The movie is a remake of 2012 Punjabi movie Carry On Jatta which itself was loosely based on 1989 Malayalam movie Chakkikotha Chankaran. Farin Khan made her debut with Dhat Teri Ki

Cast
 Arifin Shuvo as Raj
 Nusrat Faria as Shanti
 Ziaul Roshan as Salman
 Farin Khan as Madhuri
 Biswanath Basu as Raj's Uncle
 Sushoma Sarkar as Raj's Aunt
 Subrata as Madhuri's Father
 Rajatava Dutta as Raj's Father 
 Sadek Bachchu as Salman's Father
 Subhasish Mukherjee as Tera Saddam
 Supriyo Dutta as Shanti's Brother

Production 
The film was produced by Jaaz Multimedia, who also distributed the film. Filming of the movie took place in February 2017, in places including Bangkok.

Release 
Dhat Teri Ki released nationwide in Bangladesh alongside the holiday Bengali New Year on 14 April 2017. In November 2017, it was announced by Jaaz Multimedia that with an exchange of films with SVF Entertainment, Dhat Teri Ki will be released in India.

Soundtrack 
The soundtrack of Dhat Teri Ki features music composed by Emon Saha, Shawkat Ali Emon, Dabbu and Imran Mahmudul. The soundtrack also features the vocals of Kona and Satrujit Dasgupta.

References

External links
 

Bengali-language Bangladeshi films
Bangladeshi romantic comedy films
Bangladeshi remakes of Indian films
Films scored by Dabbu
2010s Bengali-language films
2017 romantic comedy films
Films directed by Shamim Ahamed Roni
Bengali remakes of Telugu films
Jaaz Multimedia films